In addition to solo careers and within the larger aggregate of Crosby, Stills, Nash & Young, the musical team of David Crosby and Graham Nash performed and recorded regularly as a duo, mostly during the 1970s and the 2000s.

History
After the success of Déjà Vu and the subsequent break-up of the quartet in the summer of 1970, all four members of CSNY released solo albums. Crosby's If I Could Only Remember My Name and Nash's Songs for Beginners both appeared in 1971 and were both certified gold records by the RIAA. Building upon the momentum of a BBC-produced September 11, 1970, acoustic special shot in Manchester, the two good friends toured acoustically in the autumn of 1971 to favorable reviews; one night from this tour would be released 27 years later as Another Stoney Evening. 

In 1972 the two decided to record an album, resulting in Graham Nash David Crosby, which reached No. 4 on the Billboard 200, demonstrating that the two were still a viable draw without the more successful Stills and Young. Further work together later in 1972 was precluded by Crosby's participation in the Byrds' reunion album recording sessions. In 1973, the pair began to tour regularly, also joining Neil Young for the tour that would result in his Time Fades Away album. Crosby continued to collaborate with electronic music pioneer and Grateful Dead associate Ned Lagin on Seastones (1975) and other unreleased ventures, while Nash recorded a second solo album, Wild Tales (1974). During this time, singularly and together they contributed backing vocals to various albums by associates in the California rock scene, including Stephen Stills (1970), Young's Harvest (1972), Jackson Browne's Late for the Sky (1974), and Joni Mitchell's Court and Spark (1974).

In 1974 both joined the Crosby, Stills, Nash & Young reunion tour and an attempt at the recording of a new album in Hawaii, sessions for which had continued in fits and starts after commencing in 1973. After failing to complete an album, Crosby and Nash signed a contract with ABC Records. Due to contractual obligations to their old label, the cassette and 8-track tape versions of their ABC LPs were issued by Atlantic. Recording activity yielded Wind on the Water (1975; No. 6) and Whistling Down the Wire (1976; No. 26), both of which received RIAA gold certifications. Notably, Wind on the Water was the highest-charting album released by members of the quartet between 1973 and 1977.

Stephen Stills and Neil Young invited the duo to a recording session for their Long May You Run project in the spring of 1976, leading to a brief CSNY reunion. However, Crosby and Nash were forced to leave the recording sessions because they had time constraints for completing Whistling Down the Wire, prompting Stills and Young to wipe their vocals and release the album under the imprimatur of the Stills-Young Band. Crosby & Nash vowed not to work with either Stills or Young again, that oath lasting not even a year as they reconvened with Stills for the second Crosby Stills & Nash album in 1977. Young kept alternate copies of the tracks and released the version of "Long May You Run" with Crosby and Nash's vocals on his 1977 album Decade. 

ABC released four albums by Crosby & Nash prior to its being bought by the MCA conglomerate in 1979. In addition to the two aforementioned studio albums, the concert document Crosby-Nash Live appeared in 1977, and a compilation (The Best of Crosby & Nash) in 1978. All four albums featured their backing band the Mighty Jitters, consisting of Craig Doerge (keyboards), Tim Drummond (bass; beginning in 1975), Danny Kortchmar (lead guitar and occasional bass), Russ Kunkel (drums), and multi-instrumentalist David Lindley (slide guitar, pedal steel guitar, viola, violin). During the recording of Wind on the Water, session bassist Leland Sklar alternated with Drummond, and the line-up of Doerge, Kortchmar, Kunkel, and Sklar recorded throughout the epoch as the Section after providing the backup for much of the first Crosby & Nash album on Atlantic. Depending upon availability of the various members, the twosome would either tour as an electric-based aggregation (exclusively with the Mighty Jitters after 1973) or in a semi-acoustic format with Doerge and Lindley. The pair's initial fall 1973 electric tour backing band omitted Kortchmar and included Jefferson Starship drummer John Barbata in lieu of Kunkel; after falling ill with influenza, Lindley was replaced for the remaining dates by future Eagles guitarist Don Felder.

When CSN reunited on a more-or-less permanent basis in 1977, Doerge followed the group to Miami for the CSN sessions and ensuing tours through 1978, also co-writing the song "Shadow Captain" with Crosby. Doerge would continue to collaborate regularly with Crosby & Nash in various permutations until the early 1990s, co-producing Nash's Innocent Eyes (1986) and Crosby's Oh Yes I Can (1989).

Following aborted CSN sessions in 1978, Crosby & Nash attempted to record a new album for Capitol Records a year later, but the project was dampened by Crosby's increased dependence upon freebase cocaine. Material from the sessions eventually appeared on Nash's Earth & Sky without any songs from Crosby. Crosby's problems during the 1980s with drugs, and his prison time, largely precluded any activity solely with Nash, although the pair appeared on the CSN and CSNY albums of that decade and resumed touring intermittently as a duo after Crosby's release. The 1990 CSN album Live It Up started as a Crosby & Nash record, but like its predecessor Daylight Again which was initially sessions for a Stills & Nash effort, Atlantic Records was reluctant to release a project that did not include the full trio.

In 2004 Crosby & Nash released their first original studio record since 1976 with the double-album Crosby & Nash on Sanctuary Records, with backing mostly by touring members of Crosby's band CPR. A single CD version was released in 2006 when CSNY began their Freedom of Speech '06 Tour. On the Graham Nash box set Reflections, released in February 2009, a recording of the track "In Your Name" from October 21, 2007, by the same band used for the Crosby & Nash album, including Crosby on backing vocals.

Nash stated in March 2016 that he would likely never work with Crosby again due to strained relations between the two; Crosby died in January 2023.

Other work 
In addition to their album work, Crosby & Nash were the harmony vocalists of choice for a number of prominent singer-songwriters and album-oriented rock performers in the 1970s. Their most recognizable session work includes "Love the One You're With" and "Sit Yourself Down" on Stephen Stills' 1970 Stephen Stills, "Are You Ready for the Country?" (the two also contributed vocals to one other track each, both as a duo with Stills, with Crosby and Stills appearing in "Alabama" and Stills and Nash on "Words") Neil Young's 1972 Harvest album, and the hit singles "Free Man in Paris" by Joni Mitchell in 1974, "Mexico" by James Taylor in 1975, and "The Pretender" by Jackson Browne in 1976. They also appeared on albums by Dave Mason, J.D. Souther, Elton John, Art Garfunkel, Gary Wright, Carole King, John Mayer, and David Gilmour, as recently as on Gilmour's Rattle That Lock (2015).

Discography
See also discographies for Crosby, Stills, Nash & Young, and individually for David Crosby and Graham Nash.

Studio albums

Other releases

Singles

References

External links
Official Crosby & Nash site

American musical duos
Rock music duos
David Crosby
Graham Nash
1970 establishments in California
2015 disestablishments in California